An honor walk (or hero walk) is a ceremonial event to commemorate a patient whose organs are donated. The event typically takes place as the patient is transported to an operating room or waiting ambulance prior to organ procurement. It is typically held for patients on life support but can also be held for living donors as well.

Context
As of 2022, over 100,000 people are on the national organ transplant waiting list in the United States, with 17 people dying per day waiting for a transplant. An individual donor can provide up to eight organs.

Procedure
As the patient is transported to the operating room or a waiting ambulance, the hallways are lined with hospital staff and the patient's friends and family. The event is intended to show appreciation and respect for the patient's decision to donate their organs and may include an honor guard in the case of a veteran.

Media
In February 2020, the Center for Investigative Reporting podcast Reveal discussed the rising trend of honor walks during the process of organ donation in an episode titled The Honor Walk.

References
 

Organ donation
Death customs
Walking